Pioneer Conference may refer to:

 Pioneer Conference (Illinois), intercollegiate athletic conference that existed in the U.S. state of Illinois from 1947 to 1949
 Pioneer Conference (Indiana), high school athletic conference in the U.S. state of Indiana, founded in 2009
 Pioneer Conference (Ohio), high school athletic conference in the U.S. state of Ohio, founded in 1977
 Pioneer Conference (Texas), junior college athletic conference that existed in the U.S. state of Texas from 1949 to 1961